Tatyana Logatskaya (born 18 July 1977) is a Belarusian table tennis player. She competed in the women's doubles event at the 2004 Summer Olympics.

References

1977 births
Living people
Belarusian female table tennis players
Olympic table tennis players of Belarus
Table tennis players at the 2004 Summer Olympics
Sportspeople from Minsk